Genesee College was founded as the Genesee Wesleyan Seminary, in 1831, by the Methodist Episcopal Church. The college was located in Lima, New York, and eventually relocated to Syracuse, becoming Syracuse University.

Genesee Wesleyan Seminary

In 1831, the Genesee Wesleyan Seminary was founded in Lima, south of Rochester, by the Genesee Annual Conference of the Methodist Episcopal Church. The Rev. Dr. Samuel Luckey was elected the first principal of the seminary, and was transferred from the New York Annual Conference to the Genesee Conference of the M.E. Church . He remained in office until 1836, when he was elected as editor of The Christian Advocate and Journal, an important periodical for the M.E. General Conference.

The institution is said to have "opened most favorably," with a total enrollment of 341 the first year (1831–32), with 170-180 students attending at any one time. The Agents of the seminary solicited funds for the construction of buildings. In 1880, Bishop Matthew Simpson of the M.E. Church described the seminary's early years thus "no other institution in the church accomplishing apparently more in the education of active and useful young men and young women."  The early years of the institution were said to be ones of "great prosperity." This was especially true under the administrations of the Rev. Schuyler Seager. Seager was born 8 July 1807 in Simsbury, Connecticut. He joined the Genesee Conference in 1833. He graduated from Wesleyan University in 1836. That same year he was appointed Teacher of Moral Science and Belles-Lettres in the Genesee Wesleyan Seminary. He was chosen as Principal of the seminary in 1837. After entering pastoral ministry in 1844, he returned to the seminary in 1854, again as Principal.In 1856-57 he was made Principal of the Genesee Model School in Lima, New York, an offshoot of the seminary. Joseph Cummings was appointed President of Genesee in 1854, a position he held until 1857.

In 1850 it was resolved to enlarge the institution from a seminary into a college, or to connect a college with the seminary. The Rev. Dr. Benjamin Franklin Tefft was elected President of this endeavor. The name was chosen as Genesee College. However, the location was thought by many not to be sufficiently central.  Its difficulties were compounded by the next set of technological changes: the railroad that displaced the Erie Canal as the region's economic engine bypassed Lima completely. In 1866, after several hard years, the trustees of the struggling college decided to seek a locale whose economic and transportation advantages could provide a better base of support.  As Genesee College began looking for a new home, the bustling community of Syracuse, ninety miles to the east, was engaged in a search of its own. The rail age had expanded the prosperity brought by the Erie Canal, and the city was booming, but its citizens yearned for something more:
"What gives to Oxford and Cambridge, England, to Edinburgh, Scotland, to New Haven, Connecticut, their most illustrious names abroad?" asked one local writer. "Their Universities," he answered. "Syracuse has all the advantages: business, social, and religious – let her add the educational and she adds to her reputation, her desirability."
After a year of dispute between the Methodist ministers, Lima and contending cities across the state, it was resolved to remove the college to Syracuse, New York.  In 1869, Genesee College obtained New York State approval to move to Syracuse, but Lima got a court injunction to block the move, and Genesee stayed in Lima until it was dissolved in 1875. At its founding on March 24, 1870, the state of New York granted the university its charter independent of Genesee College.  The university opened in September 1871. The college, its libraries, the students and faculty, and the college's two secret societies all relocated to Syracuse. Two seminary / college buildings were listed on the National Register of Historic Places in 1976.

Notable faculty and graduates 
 Anna Smeed Benjamin (1834-1924), social reformer
 John E. Bennett (1833-1893), served on both the Arkansas Supreme Court and the South Dakota Supreme Court
 Joseph Cummings, President of Genesee
 J. W. Eddy (1832-1916),  builder of the Angels Flight funicular railway in Los Angeles, California
 George B. Goodwin, Wisconsin legislator and attorney
 Elias DeWitt Huntley, graduate, professor of ancient languages; later president of Lawrence University; Chaplain of the Senate
 Belva Ann Lockwood (1830–1917), attorney, politician, educator and author
 Benjamin Franklin Tefft, President of Genesee
 Adeline Margaret Tesky (1855-1924), novelist and short story writer
 Edward C. Walker, N.Y. state legislator and attorney
 Sultan bin Salman bin Abdulaziz Al Saud, Second son of King Salman of Saudi Arabia

References

Syracuse University
Defunct private universities and colleges in New York (state)
Educational institutions established in 1831
1831 establishments in New York (state)
Educational institutions disestablished in the 1870s
1875 disestablishments in New York (state)